The Túpac Katari Indian Movement – 1 (Spanish: Movimiento Indio Túpac Katari – 1; MITKA-1) was an Indigenous political party in Bolivia.

In 1980, Constantino Lima Chávez split from the Túpac Katari Indian Movement and founded the Túpac Katari Indian Movement-1. Constantino Lima Chávez adhered to a more extreme line which bordered on outright racism, rejected religious precepts and the validity of political divisions into 'left' or 'right', and maintained that 99% of change would be achieved through the use of violence.

The MITKA-1 took part in the 1980 elections, running Constantino Lima Chávez. He polled 1.30 per cent of the vote.

In 1985 the MITKA-1 disappeared.

Notes

1980 establishments in Bolivia
1985 disestablishments in Bolivia
Defunct political parties in Bolivia
Indigenist political parties in South America
Indigenous organisations in Bolivia
Katarism
Political parties disestablished in 1985
Political parties established in 1980